This is a list of military equipment of the Spanish Republicans. The Soviet Union was the main provider of Republican military equipment.

Weapons 
 List of Spanish Civil War weapons of the Republicans

Aircraft 
 List of aircraft of the Spanish Republican Air Force

Ships 
 Spanish Civil War Republican ship classes

References

Spanish Republican military equipment of the Spanish Civil War
Republican military equipment of the Spanish Civil War
Armed Forces of the Second Spanish Republic